Chris Oliver was a software engineer at Sun Microsystems, and the creator of their JavaFX family of products. He came to Sun through their SeeBeyond acquisition, and had earlier designed the architecture for the ICAN 5.0 suite of products (now Java Caps).

References

Living people
American software engineers
Year of birth missing (living people)
Place of birth missing (living people)